Abu Ishaq al-Saffar al-Bukhari, was an important representative of the Sunni theological school of Abu Mansur al-Maturidi (d. c. 333/944) and the author of Talkhis al-Adilla li-Qawa'id al-Tawhid which is a voluminous kalam work.

He lived in Bukhara under the dominance of West Karakhanids. His theological works, his method in kalam, and frequent reference to his works by Ottoman and Arab scholars indicate that al-Saffar is a respected and authoritative Hanafi-Maturidi theologian who systematically established his ideas about kalam believing that information based upon reason, revealed knowledge and senses are determinative in his area.

Name 
Abu Ishaq Ibrahim b. Isma'il b. Ahmad b. Ishaq b. Shayth, known as al-Zahid al-Saffar.

The alternative name Ibrahim b. Ishaq, recorded by Brockelmann in his GAL, is found only in the British Museum manuscript no. 1577, Add. 27526, and is presumably erroneous, since the few bibliographical sources that mention al-Saffar call him Ibn Isma'il.

Books 

In his work titled Talkhis al-Adilla li-Qawa'id al-Tawhid on kalām, he wrote extensively about al-Asma' al-Husna (the Most Beautiful Names of God). Approximately one third of this work, published in two volumes, was devoted to al-Asma' al-Husna. In the pre-Saffar Hanafi-Maturidi theological literature, there was no other work that addressed al-Asma' al-Husna in such an extensive way.

Notes

See also 
 Abu Hanifa
 Abu Mansur al-Maturidi
 Abu al-Yusr al-Bazdawi
 Abu al-Mu'in al-Nasafi
 List of Ash'aris and Maturidis
 List of Muslim theologians

Further reading

References 

Hanafis
Maturidis
11th-century Muslim theologians
Sunni imams
Sunni Muslim scholars of Islam
Hanafi fiqh scholars
12th-century Muslim theologians
1067 births
1139 deaths